Masashi Chikazawa (born June 26, 1982) is a former baseball player from Japan.  Masashi Chikazawa played in the Japan Pacific League for the  Osaka Kintetsu Buffaloes. He later played for Reno.

References

Japanese baseball players
Living people
1982 births
Place of birth missing (living people)
Osaka Kintetsu Buffaloes players
Tohoku Rakuten Golden Eagles players